Filifusus is a genus of sea snails, marine gastropod mollusks in the family Fasciolariidae, the spindle snails, the tulip snails and their allies.

Species
Species within the genus Filifusus include:
 Filifusus altimasta (Iredale, 1930)
 Filifusus filamentosus (Röding, 1798)
 Filifusus glaber (Dunker, 1882)
 Filifusus inermis (Jonas, 1846)
 Filifusus manuelae (Bozzetti, 2008)

References

 Snyder M.A., Vermeij G.J. & Lyons W.G. (2012) The genera and biogeography of Fasciolariinae (Gastropoda, Neogastropoda, Fasciolariidae). Basteria 76(1-3): 31-70

Fasciolariidae
Gastropod genera